Missouri Mountain is a high mountain summit in the Collegiate Peaks of the Sawatch Range of the Rocky Mountains of North America. Missouri Mountain is separated from its eastern neighbor Mount Belford by Elkhead Pass (13,220 feet).

See also

List of mountain peaks of Colorado
List of Colorado fourteeners

References

External links
 
 Missouri Mountain on Summitpost

Mountains of Colorado
Mountains of Chaffee County, Colorado
Fourteeners of Colorado
North American 4000 m summits